Ahmet Shala was the Minister of Economy and Finance in the Government of Kosovo from 2008 to 2011. 

He also served as Ambassador to Japan, but resigned suddenly amidst controversy.

External links
 Interview

Finance ministers of Kosovo
Kosovo Albanians
Living people
Politicians from Vushtrri
Year of birth missing (living people)
Ambassadors of Kosovo